is a Japanese manga series written by Yuto Yotsuba and illustrated by Ryō Ogawa. The series was serialized in Kodansha's Comic Days website from December 2019 to November 2021 and later in Weekly Young Magazine. It has been collected in 12 tankōbon volumes as of January 2023. Set in the Shibuya special ward in Tokyo, the series centers on Zhuge Liang, who transported from ancient China to modern Japan, and uses military tactics to transform his new friend, Eiko Tsukimi, into a music star.

An anime television series adaptation produced by P.A. Works was streamed from March to June 2022 and aired on television from April to June of the same year. Sentai Filmworks has licensed the series outside of Japan and streamed on its HIDIVE platform.

Premise
The famous military strategist Zhuge Liang Kongming met his demise in the Battle of Wuzhang Plains in 234. On his deathbed, he wishes that his next life were in a peaceful place, free from bloodshed. He is reborn (in his youth) in modern Japan, appearing in the middle of a costume party for Halloween in the club district of Tokyo. The partygoers (in Japanese, "Paripi, a contraction of the English 'party people') of Shibuya lure him to a night club where he meets Eiko Tsukimi, an aspiring singer, and his second life begins.

Characters

A young woman who made her debut as a singer, Eiko, and hopes to become a singer-songwriter, her singing was praised by Kongming as "having the power to convey your heart to others". Born in Kyoto, her father left her mother and daughter in order to seize the opportunity to pursue his musical dream in the United States, which led her mother to strongly oppose Eiko's exposure to music. She also believed that her mother drove her father away from their home, and indirectly caused the mother-daughter relationship to become estranged and rifted. As Eiko was trying to jump off the railroad tracks in her attempt to commit suicide, she got rescued by Kobayashi, and was invited to listen to the singing of American songstress Maria Diesel at the BB Lounge run by Kobayashi, and regained her hope of life, so she was determined to move people's hearts as a singer, and regained her hope in life, so then, she started working at the BB Lounge as a resident singer and store clerk. At the beginning of the story, when she met Kongming, she almost gave up her dream, but with the support of Kongming, she gradually began to struggle and grow. With the official establishment of the record company "Fourth Kingdom", she became the main singer of "Fourth Kingdom". Her characters are named after Huang Yueying (Kongming's wife), a character in the Three Kingdoms period, but her character settings are more like Liu Bei (Kongming's Lord), and there is no ambiguous plot between her and Kongming.

The brilliant and smart strategist and the Chancellor of Shu Han during the Three Kingdoms Period, known as Mr. Wolong (Sleeping Dragon), who died at the Battle of Wuzhang Plains in 234, but somehow got reincarnated in the modern-day Shibuya in his youthful appearance. By chance, he encounters Eiko during her singing performance during the Holloween party and later gets picked up by her. Eiko's songs move his heart thrice, so he decides to become her strategist, in order to help her realize her dream of becoming a great songstress. With a high IQ and a strong thirst for knowledge, he quickly adapts to modern life after being reincarnated into the modern age. Kongming later successfully planned and promoted the three major record companies "SSS Music", "V-Ex", "Key Time" to jointly participate in the large-scale music event "The Orion of 4 years ago" as an opportunity, and Eiko and others established the record company "Fourth Kingdom".

His real name is Taijin Kawabe; a young rapper who has dominated the MC rap contest "DRB" for three consecutive years, and has the nickname of unrivalled freestyle. However, because he could not stand the pressure, he left the rap world after losing the battle due to stomach ulcers in the MC duel. However, after hearing Eiko's singing in the BB Lounge and his heated confrontation with Kongming's MC Battle, he regained his enthusiasm and decided to make a comeback as a rapper and become a partner of Eiko and others. The name of the person is "Kabe", which is the Japanese word for "wall", which corresponds to Seki (Red) of Sekitoba (Red Hare) Kung Fu.

 Azalea's vocalist and bassist; along with guitarist Ichika, and drummer Futaba, they are university friends. In university, the three formed a band out of their passion for music, but due to commercial marketing considerations, they had to follow Toshihito Karasawa's policy, and they gradually lost their original intentions and will. Nanami sang Maria Diesel's song "I'm still alive today" on the street without makeup, and met Eiko who was also trying to perform on the street. As she listens to the singing of Kabetaijin and Eiko, she recalls their original intentions in the music industry and is moved to tears. They chose to interpret their songs in their own way and received a warm response from fans. They also obtained 100,000 likes through Kongming's assistance, and became friends with Eiko and others. Afterwards, she re-accepts Karasawa as their producer, and assists Eiko with advices to develop her music career.

The owner of the BB Lounge. Although he has a strong personality, he is a Three Kingdoms otaku and he also likes to play Go. In the past, he rescued Eiko, who tried committing suicide, and let her assist in the store and serve as a resident singer. Because he admired Kongming who could answer his tough questions during the interview, he hired him as a receptionist and a bartender in the BB Lounge. Originally, after Eiko's gradual rise, he thought that the small size of the BB  Lounge would limit Eiko's development, but due to Kong Ming's strategy, which led the group to set up a record company called "Fourth Kingdom", and chose to continue to assist Eiko and others. He is the key person who inspired Eiko to create a new song, "Hot Chill Hot".

Media

Manga
Ya Boy Kongming!, written and illustrated by Yuto Yotsuba and illustrated by Ryō Ogawa, was serialized in Kodansha's Comic Days online platform from December 31, 2019, to November 16, 2021. The series was transferred to Weekly Young Magazine starting on November 22, 2021. Kodansha has collected its chapters into individual tankōbon volumes. The first volume was released on April 8, 2020. As of January 6, 2023, twelve volumes have been released.

The manga has been licensed for English digital release in North America by Kodansha USA, with the first volume released on June 1, 2021.

Volume list

Anime
An anime television series adaptation by P.A. Works was announced in November 2021. The series was directed by Shū Honma, with Yōko Yonaiyama overseeing series' scripts, Kanami Sekiguchi designing the characters, and Genki Hikota composing the music. It was streamed on Abema and other platforms from March 31 to June 16, 2022, and aired on Tokyo MX, MBS, and BS NTV from April 5 to June 21 of the same year. Sentai Filmworks has licensed the series outside of Asia. At their Otakon panel in July 2022, Sentai Filmworks announced that the series will receive an English dub, which is set to premiere on September 23, 2022.

Episode list

Reception
The series won the Next Manga Award's U-NEXT award in the web category in 2020. The series ranked 9th on the "Nationwide Bookstore Employees' Recommended Comics of 2021" by the Honya Club website. As of October 2022, the manga had over 1.2 million copies in circulation.

Accolades

Notes

References

Further reading

External links
  
 Ya Boy Kongming! official anime website 
 

2022 anime television series debuts
Animation based on real people
Anime series based on manga
Comedy anime and manga
Comics based on real people
Japanese webcomics
Kodansha manga
Music in anime and manga
P.A.Works
Seinen manga
Sentai Filmworks
Tokyo MX original programming
Webcomics in print
Works based on Romance of the Three Kingdoms